Dapdap, also known as Tinago, is a barangay in the municipality of Tarangnan, Samar in the Philippines. The barangay is home to the San Francisco de Asis Church, a 16th-century church ruins located atop a hill.

The Old Church of Tinago
Built in 16th century upon the arrival of the three Jesuit missionaries, Francisco De Otazo, SJ, Bartolome Martes, SJ, and Domingo Alonzo, SJ, on October 15, 1596. The Jesuit fathers started their mission as a lay faithful teaching catechism, healing the sick and spread the good news of the Catholic faith. The faith planted 400 years ago and it is much very alive among the people of Samar.

Tinago as Cabecera

Tinago was the first town to be Christianized by the Jesuits and was made as the cabecera (center or capital) of the island of Samar. Francisco Ignacio Alcina, SJ, the author of nine series book Historia de Las Islas y Indio de Bisaya was also assigned in the parish of St. Francis of Assisi in the church of Tinago. In 1616, the Moro pirates burned down their residence and rammed down the walls of the mission center in Tinago. The Jesuits decided to transfer it to the village of Catbalogan.

Transferring the Cabecera from Tinago (Dapdap) to Tarangnan

Tarangnan was legally constituted by authority of the governor of Samar, Gov. Enrique Chacon, who promulgated the transfer of the site of Poblacion or town center from Dapdap to Tarangnan. This movement started on June 20, 1881, when suggested to his superiors that the poblacion be transferred from Dapdap to Tarangnan considering the following reasons:

 That Dapdap had hygienic problems, it being surrounded by mangrove swamps, hills and mountains that prevent winds from cleansing the area of hot and foul atmosphere.
 That there was a problem of accessibility, and therefore disadvantageous to both the spiritual and governmental administration.
 That Dapdap had no more available lands for expansion.
 Tarangnan on the contrary was in a healthier site, it had an all-weather port, with lands sprawling wide for a growing population.

The Gobernadorcillo of Dapdap, Mr. Villanueva Perez, and other principales opposed to move. They manifested that it is hard for them to abandon their fields, their livestock and their lands in which they were accustomed to live, but apparently their arguments centered on their desire to prevent the transfer of the blessed image of Saint Francis of Assisi to Tarangnan. The parish priest, Fr. Angel Pulido OFM., refuted all and every reason and ultimately filed a complaint against for the imputed crime of insurrection. The contradictory testimonies presented in the course of the investigation precipitated and incident resulting in the arrest of the Dapdap officials. However, Adolfo Rodriguez of the Visayan Regional Office recommended their release and reinstatement to their public office, but the phenomenal removal in 1882 of the altar and the image of Saint Francis to Tarangnan deeply touched the Dapdap leaders and followers.
On October 9, 1883, disregarding evaluation of the attendant circumstances, the move of the poblacion was ordered by a decree of Governor General Fernando Primo de Rivera, and was approved by King Alfonso I of Spain in April 1884. The new pueblo of Tarangnan rapidly prospered. Subsidiary population clusters from nearby visitas, barangays, Rancherias, and sitios immigrated to the poblacion. By 1896, Tarangnan had 1,392 inhabitants while Dapdap just 533, and indication that Tarangnan indeed surpassed the former poblacion in strategic importance.

St. Francis of Assisi

Tarangnan up to the present is still considered a pilgrim land. There are times when voyages or devotees from different towns of Samar, Leyte and neighboring provinces, come on a certain day to pay homage, to say a novena, and to show their love and veneration to the miraculous image of St. Francis of Assisi, the Patron Saint of Tarangnan and the town's perennial protector and instrument of peace.

References

Barangays of Samar (province)